The  Las Vegas Gladiators season was the 11th season for the arena football franchise, their 5th in Las Vegas. They looked to make the playoffs after finishing 2006 with a 5–11 record. They went 2–14 and missed the playoffs. This was the final season in Las Vegas, as the team moved to Cleveland to become the Cleveland Gladiators.

Schedule

Coaching
Danton Barto entered his first season as the head coach of the Gladiators.

Stats

Offense

Quarterback

Running backs

Wide receivers

Touchdowns

Defense

Special teams

Kick return

Kicking

External links

Las Vegas Gladiators
Las Vegas Gladiators seasons
Las